The 2019 Chinese Football Association Member Association Champions League (Simplified Chinese: 2019中国足球协会会员协会冠军联赛), also known as SWM Motors 2019 Chinese Football Association Member Association Champions League for sponsorship reasons (Simplified Chinese: SWM斯威汽车2019中国足球协会会员协会冠军联赛), formerly known as  Chinese Football Association Bing League (中国足球协会丙级联赛) (before 2006) and Chinese Football Association Amateur League (中国足球协会业余联赛) (2006–2017), is the fourth-tier football league of the People's Republic of China. The league is under the auspices of the Chinese Football Association.

Promotion and relegation

From Champions League 
Teams promoted to 2019 China League Two
 Taizhou Yuanda
 Chengdu Better City
 Hubei Chufeng United
 Hangzhou Wuyue Qiantang
 Lhasa Urban Construction Investment
 Nanjing Shaye
 Shanxi Metropolis
 Yunnan Kunlu
 Wuhan Shangwen
 Guangxi Baoyun
 Qingdao Red Lions
 Xi'an Daxing Chongde

Format 
The qualification structure is as follows:
Qualifying Round: Chinese Football Association subordinate Provincial League and City League, champion will advance to the Regional Finals.
Regional Finals: 50-60 teams were divided into 10 groups of five or six teams to play single round robin matches. The ten group winners and the six best group runners-up advanced to the National Finals.
National Finals: 16 teams were divided into two groups, North and South. The league is made up of two stages, the group stage and the play-off. The Group Stage is a play single round robin matches. The Play-off Stage is a two-legged elimination. The winners may be qualify for the 2020 China League Two.

Qualifying round 
China Amateur Football League includes 44 regional leagues. 2018 or 2019 season champion will advance to the Regional Finals.

Teams qualified for the Regional Finals

{|class=wikitable style=text-align:center;width:1000px;
!Groups!!No!!FA!!Team!!Qualifying method!!Position!!Remark
|-
|rowspan=6 |A
|1|| Guangdong FA || Huizhou Huixin ||2018 Chinese Champions League|| Group ||
|-
|2|| Guangdong FA ||Maoming Oil City ||2018 Chinese Champions League|| Group ||
|-
|3|| Shenzhen FA || Shenzhen Bogang || 2018 Shenzhen FA Super League ||Fourth place||
|-
|4|| Guangxi FA || Liuzhou Ranko || 2018 Chinese Champions League|| Group ||
|-
|5|| Guangxi FA || Nanning Binjiang || 2018 Guangxi FA Super League || Third place ||
|-
|6|| Macau FA|| MFA Development ||2018 Chinese Champions League|| Group||
|- style="background-color:#AAAAAA; line-height:5pt;"
||||||||||||||
|-
|rowspan=6 |B
|1|| Shanghai FA || Shanghai Jiading Boji ||2018 Chinese Champions League|| Group  ||
|-
|2|| Nanjing FA ||Nanjing Balanta ||2018 Chinese Champions League|| Group ||
|-
|3|| Jiangsu FA || Yangzhou Huaao Fengyun ||  2018 Jiangsu FA Super League || 5th ||
|-
|4|| Zhejiang FA || Huzhou LOHAS ||2018 Zhejiang FA Super League|| Third place ||
|-
|5|| Zhejiang FA || Jinhua Zhongchou ||2018 Chinese Champions League|| Group ||
|-
|6|| Xiamen FA || Xiamen Nanxun || 2018 Xiamen FA Football League || Runners-up ||
|- style="background-color:#AAAAAA; line-height:5pt;"
||||||||||||||
|-
|rowspan=5 |C
|1|| Liaoning FA || Yingkou Chaoyue ||2018 Chinese Champions League|| 9th ||
|-
|2||  Liaoning FA ||Dandong Hantong ||2018 Chinese Champions League|| Group  ||
|-
|3|| Shanxi FA || Shanxi Zhisheng  || 2018 Chinese Champions League  ||Group ||
|-
|4|| Shanxi FA ||Shanxi Jinzhihu ||2018 Chinese Champions League||Group ||
|-
|5||Qingdao FA || Qingdao Zhongchuang Hengtai || 2018 Chinese Champions League|| Group ||
|- style="background-color:#AAAAAA; line-height:5pt;"
||||||||||||||
|-
|rowspan=5 |D
|1|| Guangdong FA ||Zhaoqing Topfung Eastlake ||  ||  ||
|-
|2|| Guangzhou FA || Guangzhou Glorious || 2018 Chinese Champions League|| Group ||
|-
|3|| Hainan FA || Qionghai Jinghaicheng || 2018 Hainan FA Super League || Fourth place ||
|-
|4|| Hainan FA || Sanya Qinghao || 2018 Hainan FA Super League || 5th ||
|-
|5|| Fujian FA || Fuzhou Hengxing ||2018 Chinese Champions League|| Group ||
|- style="background-color:#AAAAAA; line-height:5pt;"
||||||||||||||
|-
|rowspan=6 |E
|1|| Shandong FA ||Heze Caozhou || Qualified position of Weifang Juexiaoya ||  ||
|-
|2|| Shandong FA ||Zibo Origin || Qualified position of Zibo United ||  ||
|-
|3|| Inner Mongolia FA || Hulunbuir Xinehen ||2018 Chinese Champions League|| Group ||
|-
|4|| Inner Mongolia FA || Ewenki Xiongying || ||  ||
|-
|5|| Dalian FA ||Dalian Huayi || 2017 Dalian FA Super League  || 7th ||
|-
|6|| Yanbian FA ||Yanbian Hailanjiang ||  ||  ||
|- style="background-color:#AAAAAA; line-height:5pt;"
||||||||||||||
|-
|rowspan=5 |F
|1|| Chengdu FA || Sichuan Top Shine || 2018 Chengdu FA Super League || Runners-up ||
|-
|2|| Chengdu FA || Chengdu Decci ||2018 Chinese Champions League|| Group ||
|-
|3|| Chongqing FA || Chongqing Dikai || 2018 Chinese Champions League|| Group ||
|-
|4||  Chongqing FA ||Chongqing Rich || 2018 Chongqing FA Super League  || Fourth place ||
|-
|5|| Shaanxi FA ||Xi'an UKD || Qualified position of Shaanxi Nanqin ||  ||
|- style="background-color:#AAAAAA; line-height:5pt;"
||||||||||||||
|-
|rowspan=5 |G
|1|| Wuhan FA || Hubei Huachuang || 2018 Chinese Champions League|| Group ||
|-
|2|| Wuhan FA ||Wuhan Freeman ||2018 Chinese Champions League|| Group ||
|-
|3|| Henan FA || Henan Orient Classic || 2018 Henan FA Football League || Winners ||
|-
|4|| Henan FA || Luoyang Saile || 2018 Henan FA Football League || Runners-up ||
|-
|5|| Shandong FA || Shandong Wangyue || Qualified position of Jinan Huaixing ||  ||
|- style="background-color:#AAAAAA; line-height:5pt;"
||||||||||||||
|-
|rowspan=5 |H
|1|| Gansu FA ||Gansu Mass Ray || Qualified position of Gansu Taifeng ||  ||
|-
|2|| Gansu FA ||Lanzhou Marine Corps || 2018 Gansu FA Football League || Third place ||
|-
|3||Shaanxi FA || Yulin Caogen || 2018 Shaanxi FA Super League || Runners-up ||
|-
|4||  Xi'an FA ||Xi'an Hi-Tech Yilian ||  ||  ||
|-
|5|| Inner Mongolia FA ||Ulanqab Qile ||  ||  ||
|- style="background-color:#AAAAAA; line-height:5pt;"
||||||||||||||
|-
|rowspan=6 |I
|1|| Xiamen FA || Xiamen Nanhu || 2018 Xiamen FA Football League || 10th ||
|-
|2|| Xiamen FA || Xiamen Zhenhao || 2018 Xiamen FA Football League || 5th ||
|-
|3|| Hubei FA || Hubei Wuhan Athletics Zaiming||2018 Chinese Champions League|| Group ||
|-
|4|| Hainan FA || Hainan Wanning Tengji || 2018 Hainan FA Super League || Runners-up ||
|-
|5|| Hainan FA || Lingshui Dingli Jingcheng || 2018 Hainan FA Super League || Third place ||
|-
|6||  Zhejiang FA || Ningbo Yinbo ||2018 Zhejiang FA Super League|| Runners-up ||
|- style="background-color:#AAAAAA; line-height:5pt;"
||||||||||||||
|-
|rowspan=5 |J
|1||| Nanjing FA || Nanjing Fengfan || 2018 Nanjing FA Super League || 8th ||
|-
|2|| Shanghai FA || Shanghai Huajiao ||2018 Chinese Champions League|| Group ||
|-
|3|| Shanghai FA || Shanghai Chengxun || 2018 Shanghai FA Super League || Fourth place ||
|-
|4|| Anhui FA || Wuhu Longxiang || 2019 Chinese Champions League (Anhui Group) || Winners ||
|-
|5|| Anhui FA || Anhui Huaqiang || 2019 Chinese Champions League (Anhui Group) || Runners-up ||

Regional Finals

Group A

Rules for classification: 1) Points; 2) Head-to-head points; 3) Head-to-head goal difference; 4) Head-to-head goals scored; 5) Goal difference; 6) Goals scored; 7) Disciplinary points (1 point for each yellow card, 3 points for each red card); 8) Draw

Group B

Rules for classification: 1) Points; 2) Head-to-head points; 3) Head-to-head goal difference; 4) Head-to-head goals scored; 5) Goal difference; 6) Goals scored; 7) Disciplinary points (1 point for each yellow card, 3 points for each red card); 8) Draw

Group C

Rules for classification: 1) Points; 2) Head-to-head points; 3) Head-to-head goal difference; 4) Head-to-head goals scored; 5) Goal difference; 6) Goals scored; 7) Disciplinary points (1 point for each yellow card, 3 points for each red card); 8) Draw

Group D

Rules for classification: 1) Points; 2) Head-to-head points; 3) Head-to-head goal difference; 4) Head-to-head goals scored; 5) Goal difference; 6) Goals scored; 7) Disciplinary points (1 point for each yellow card, 3 points for each red card); 8) Draw

Group E

Rules for classification: 1) Points; 2) Head-to-head points; 3) Head-to-head goal difference; 4) Head-to-head goals scored; 5) Goal difference; 6) Goals scored; 7) Disciplinary points (1 point for each yellow card, 3 points for each red card); 8) Draw

Group F

Rules for classification: 1) Points; 2) Head-to-head points; 3) Head-to-head goal difference; 4) Head-to-head goals scored; 5) Goal difference; 6) Goals scored; 7) Disciplinary points (1 point for each yellow card, 3 points for each red card); 8) Draw

Group G

Rules for classification: 1) Points; 2) Head-to-head points; 3) Head-to-head goal difference; 4) Head-to-head goals scored; 5) Goal difference; 6) Goals scored; 7) Disciplinary points (1 point for each yellow card, 3 points for each red card); 8) Draw

Group H

Rules for classification: 1) Points; 2) Head-to-head points; 3) Head-to-head goal difference; 4) Head-to-head goals scored; 5) Goal difference; 6) Goals scored; 7) Disciplinary points (1 point for each yellow card, 3 points for each red card); 8) Draw

Group I

Rules for classification: 1) Points; 2) Head-to-head points; 3) Head-to-head goal difference; 4) Head-to-head goals scored; 5) Goal difference; 6) Goals scored; 7) Disciplinary points (1 point for each yellow card, 3 points for each red card); 8) Draw

Group J

Rules for classification: 1) Points; 2) Head-to-head points; 3) Head-to-head goal difference; 4) Head-to-head goals scored; 5) Goal difference; 6) Goals scored; 7) Disciplinary points (1 point for each yellow card, 3 points for each red card); 8) Draw

Ranking of runner-up teams

Play-offs

National Finals

Qualified teams

North Group

South Group

Overall table

(C) Champion; (P) Promoted; (Q) Qualified to the phase indicated;

Play-offs

3rd-10th Place

7th-10th Place

3rd-6th Place
The two winners of this round will be directly promoted to 2020 China League Two.

9th-10th Place

7th-8th Place

5th-6th Place

3rd-4th Place

Final

1st Leg

2nd Leg

Nanjing Fengfan won 5–3 on aggregate.

References

2019 in Chinese football leagues